Mauro Boselli (born 30 August 1953 in Milan) is an Italian comic book writer and editor. He is also a novelist, screenwriter, and essayist.

Career
He joined the staff of Sergio Bonelli Editore in 1984, writing for popular comics titles such as Mister No and Zagor. He became chief editor of the latter in 1993. In 2000 he co-created together with Maurizio Colombo the horror series Dampyr. 

Ha has been chief editor of Tex since 2012 and launched a new series titled Tex Willer in 2018.

In 2022, he wrote with Mauro Uzzeo, Giovanni Masi and Alberto Ostini the film adaptation of Dampyr, directed by Riccardo Chemello.

Works

Comics

Novels
Tex Willer - Il romanzo della mia vita (Mondadori, 2011)

Filmography

References

External links

1953 births
20th-century Italian writers
21st-century Italian writers
Italian comics writers
Comic book editors
Writers from Milan
Living people